Shirley Annette Ballas (née Rich, formerly Stopford; born 6 September 1960) is an English ballroom dancer, dance teacher, and dance adjudicator. She specialises in the International Latin division, where she won several championship titles which earned her the nickname The Queen of Latin.

In 2017, Ballas was appointed head judge on the BBC TV show, Strictly Come Dancing following the departure of Len Goodman.

Life and dancing career 
Ballas was born and raised in Wallasey, Cheshire (now Merseyside), England, with brother David and mother Audrey. The children's father left the family when Shirley was 2 years old. She began dancing at age 7, and began performing competitively the following years.

At 15, Ballas moved to North Yorkshire to partner British Ballroom Champion Nigel Tiffany, which she described as "a difficult time". Two years later, she moved with Tiffany to London, where their partnership ended after dance teacher Nina Hunt convinced her to audition to partner with dancer Sammy Stopford. The two married when Ballas was 18, with the relationship ending five years later. As dance partners, their best result was winning Professional Latin at Blackpool Dance Festival in 1983.

In 1985, she married Corky Ballas. Together their best results were winning Professional Latin at Blackpool Dance Festival in 1995 and 1996
The pair moved to Houston, Texas to compete in the US. Their only child, professional ballroom dancer Mark Ballas, was born in 1986. The couple later divorced in 2007.

Ballas stopped competing in dance competitions in 1996, becoming a dance coach and judge for ballroom and Latin American competitions.

Television career

Dancing with the Stars 
Ballas has appeared on Dancing with the Stars, giving master classes and commentating on the show.

Strictly Come Dancing 
On 9 May 2017, it was announced that Ballas would be joining the judging panel of Strictly Come Dancing on BBC One, replacing Len Goodman as head judge. She made her first appearance on the panel four months later - at the launch show of series 15 on 9 September that year.

Filmography

References

External links

1960 births
Living people
People from Wallasey
English female dancers
British ballroom dancers
English expatriates in the United States
Dance teachers
Ballas family